Ann or Anne Wood may refer to:

Ann Wood Henry, née Ann Wood, Treasurer of Lancaster County, Pennsylvania
Ann Wood-Kelly, née Ann Wood, American aviator
Anne Wood, TV producer
Anne Wood (singer) (1907-1998), British mezzo-soprano and opera administrator

See also
Annie Wood (disambiguation)
Anne Woods (disambiguation)
Anna Wood (disambiguation)